The Little Colonel may refer to

 The Little Colonel, book series by Annie Fellows Johnston
 The Little Colonel (1935 film), American film
 The Little Colonel (1960 film), Spanish film